The 1969 Liberty Bowl, part of the 1969 bowl game season, took place on Saturday, December 13, at Memphis Memorial Stadium in Memphis, Tennessee. The competing teams in the eleventh edition of the Liberty Bowl were the Alabama Crimson Tide of the Southeastern Conference (SEC), and the Colorado Buffaloes of the Big Eight Conference. Favored by a point, Colorado won 47–33.

Teams

Alabama

Alabama finished the regular season with losses to Vanderbilt, Tennessee, LSU, and Auburn to compile a 6–4 record. Following their victory over Miami, the Crimson Tide accepted an invitation to play in the Liberty Bowl on November 17. The appearance marked the second for Alabama in the Liberty Bowl, and their 23rd overall bowl game.

Colorado

Colorado lost to Penn State, Oklahoma, and Nebraska to compile a 7–3 record in the regular season. Following their victory over Kansas State, the Buffaloes accepted an invitation to play in the Liberty Bowl on November 22. It was the first Liberty Bowl for Colorado and their fifth bowl appearance.

Game summary
The game kicked off shortly after 12:20 pm CST.

In a game dominated by both offenses, Colorado took a 10–0 first quarter lead. Ward Walsh scored first on a 13-yard touchdown run and Dave Haney connected on a 30-yard field goal for the Buffaloes. Early in the second quarter, Colorado extended their lead to 17–0 after a three-yard Bobby Anderson touchdown run. Alabama responded with touchdown runs of 31-yards from Scott Hunter and six-yards from George Ranager to cut the lead to 17–13. With less than three minutes remaining in the half, Walsh scored again on 15-yard touchdown run. On the ensuing drive, Alabama responded with a two-yard Johnny Musso touchdown run to make the score 24–19. However, the following kickoff was returned 91-yards by Steve Engel to give the Buffaloes a 31–19 lead at the half.

In the third quarter, Alabama took their only lead of the game following a pair of Neb Hayden touchdown passes; the first came on a 55-yard reception by Griff Langston and the second on a ten-yard reception by Musso to give the Crimson Tide a 33–31 lead. Colorado then scored 16 fourth quarter points to seal the 47–33 victory with a pair of Anderson touchdown runs and a safety made when Bill Brundige and Herb Orvis sacked Hayden in the endzone.

References

1969–70 NCAA football bowl games
1969
1969
1969
1969 in sports in Tennessee
December 1969 sports events in the United States